Bolam West Houses is a village in Northumberland, England.

References

Villages in Northumberland
Belsay